Aqua park is often used as another name for water park. See Water park for a description of the amusement park on water.

Aqua park may refer to:
Aqua Park Shinagawa in Japan
Aqua Park Macedonia in North Macedonia
Aquapark Tatralandia in Slovakia
Aquapark di Zambrone in Southern Italy
Albatros Aqua Park in Egypt
Aquapark .io Voodoo SAS application game